Oer is the name of a German noble family from Oer-Erkenschwick, Westphalia. They held the title of Baron.

Notable members 
Antonia Baronin Pilars de Pilar (1872–1946), court lady of the duchess of Mecklenburg-Schwerin
Friedrich Edmund Freiherr von Oer-Egelborg (1842–1896), chamberlain of prince Charles II. of Isenburg
Maximilian Joseph Franz of Oer (1806–1846) was a German writer
Theobald Freiherr von Oer (1807–1885), painter

German noble families
Barons Oer